Monfaucon may refer to:
 Monfaucon, Dordogne, France
 Monfaucon, Hautes-Pyrénées, France

See also
 Montfaucon (disambiguation)